The 2016–2017 Toyota Finance 86 Championship is the fourth running of the Toyota Finance 86 Championship. The championship began on 4 November 2016 at Pukekohe Park Raceway and will conclude on 12 March 2016 at Hampton Downs Motorsport Park.

Teams and drivers 
All teams were New-Zealand registered.

Race calendar and results
All rounds are to be held in New Zealand. The round one in Pukekohe Park Raceway will be held in support of the V8 Supercars. Rounds 3, 4 and 5 are to be held with the Toyota Racing Series.

Championship standings
In order for a driver to score championship points, they had to complete at least 75% of the race winner's distance, and be running at the finish. All races counted towards the final championship standings.

Scoring system

References

External links
 

Toyota Finance 86 Championship
Toyota Finance 86 Championship
Toyota Finance 86 Championship